Craig Brown (born 25 January 1954) is an Australian former cricketer. He played two first-class matches for Tasmania between 1975 and 1977.

See also
 List of Tasmanian representative cricketers

References

External links
 

1954 births
Living people
Australian cricketers
Tasmania cricketers
Cricketers from Hobart